S. Mahendar is an Indian film director working in Kannada cinema. He is also a politician with the BJP contesting from Kollegal constituency in Karnataka. He debuted into cinema with Pranayada Pakshigalu (1992) and went to direct for over 30 films. He also acted in Gattimela (2001) in the lead role under his own direction. His well-known movies include Thayi Illada Thavaru (1995), Karpoorada Gombe (1996), Snehaloka (1999), Asura (2001), Vaalee (2001), Ninagagi (2002), Gowdru (2004) and Thandege Thakka Maga (2006).

Personal life
Mahendar was married to actress Shruti who had been cast in many of his films. They have a daughter named Gowri. In 2009, Shruti applied for divorce citing understanding differences. He later married a Mysore-based Economics student, Yashoda, in 2012.

Filmography

As director

References

External links
 
 S Mahendar biography

Living people
Male actors in Kannada cinema
Indian male film actors
Kannada film directors
Kannada screenwriters
People from Chamarajanagar district
21st-century Indian male actors
20th-century Indian film directors
21st-century Indian film directors
Film directors from Karnataka
Male actors from Karachi
Kannada film producers
Film producers from Karnataka
Year of birth missing (living people)